Bobby is Going Home is a platform game released for the Atari 2600 console in 1983.

Gameplay

The player controls a boy named Bobby who has to pass through seven screens, jump over ponds, broken bridges, animals like hawks, butterflies, bats, ducks and other obstacles. The gameplay resembles Pitfall!, a game released by Activision. After the player passes seven scenes, he then can get Bobby into the house, and there the next level will show. The game has 32 levels. Hitting reset and select change the style of flowers that show at the bottom of the screen.

The music that plays throughout the game is an 8-bit rendition of "What a Friend We Have in Jesus".

References

1983 video games
Atari 2600 games
Atari 2600-only games
Bit Corporation games
Platform games
Single-player video games
Video games developed in Taiwan